Capital punishment in Monaco was abolished in 1962.

The Constitution of Monaco of 17 December 1962 states:

"The death penalty is abolished."

The last execution took place in 1847.

References

Monaco
History of Monaco
1847 disestablishments
1962 disestablishments in Monaco